Ghana Cricket Association is the official governing body of the sport of cricket in Ghana. Its current headquarters is in Accra, Ghana. Ghana Cricket Association is Ghana's representative at the International Cricket Council and is an associate member and has been a member of that body since 2002. It is also a member of the African Cricket Association.

References

External links
Cricinfo-Ghana

Cricket administration
Cricket in Ghana
cricket